This is a list of the members of the Australian House of Representatives in the 19th Australian Parliament, which was elected at the 1949 election on 10 December 1949.

In the first of two significant expansions, the house was expanded by 48 seats, from 75 (including the  Northern Territory) to 123 seats (including the Australian Capital Territory) — the other expansion in 1984 added 23 seats. In addition the seat of Bourke was replaced by Burke.  The opposition Liberal Party of Australia led by Robert Menzies with coalition partner the Country Party led by Arthur Fadden won a net of 48 additional seats, allowing it to form government.  The incumbent Australian Labor Party led by Prime Minister of Australia Ben Chifley won a net of four additional seats and the four representatives of minor parties and an independent were all defeated.

Notes

References

Members of Australian parliaments by term
20th-century Australian politicians